The World Reuse, Repair and Recycling Association (WR3A) is a business consortium dedicated to the reform of the trade of e-waste.  The WR3A is inspired by fair trade organizations.

History
WR3A is a Fair Trade association (tradename Fair Trade Recycling reserved in 2013) established both to improve the export markets for surplus electronics and e-waste, and to defend them from biased reporting and racial profiling.  WR3A was conceived in 2006 following a visit to China by a group including a USA electronics recycler (American Retroworks Inc.), a University of California Davis recycling program director, and a Seattle recycler with a zero-export policy.

The group was inspired by a visit to three of China's semi knock down factories.  Those factories purchased USA computer monitors which still have functional CRTs.  The CRTs are knocked down to the bare tube, which is inserted into a new TV or monitor case, complete with new tuner board, etc. WR3A founders observed that Western journalists reporting on the purchase and import of the used CRTs invariably described them as "primitive" wire burning operations, rather than re-manufacturers.  These were often the same contract manufacturers who originally assembled brand new CRT monitors, and now rebuilt second-hand CRTs. The USA has its own CRT refurbishing factory, Video Display Corp of Tucker, Georgia.

WR3A proposed to form a coalition of USA companies to export only functional CRT monitors directly to the reuse factories, removing imploded, damaged, screen-burned, older, or non-compliant raster (e.g. Trinitron) CRTs from loads destined for CRT factories.  The USA companies which remove and recycle the bad 1/3 of CRTs would benefit from higher prices, and the Chinese factories would bypass the sorting villages such as Guiyu.  The WR3A was swamped by orders from Asian factories that year.

The Chinese government, which took over most of the new CRT manufacturing capacity worldwide in the 1990s, eventually opposed the import of used CRTs.  Many of the SKD factory owners relocated their businesses to countries such as Indonesia, Malaysia, and Thailand.  Others relocated their used monitor sourcing operations only to Hong Kong and Vietnam, trucking the CRTs overland to Chinese factories.

During this period, several anti-globalist NGOs began a campaign to end trade in used electronics, especially CRTs. CBS 60 Minutes, The Economist, BusinessWeek and others ran reports claiming that 80% of the displays exported were not reused but burned for copper in primitive scrapyards.  The source of the 80% dumping claim later retracted it.

Eventually, reuse operations in Asia turned to re-export to Africa, and used local sources (urban Asian cities) for used CRTs used in remanufacturing new TV and monitor displays.  With the decline of purchases of used displays from the USA in 2011, WR3A recognized organizational conflicts between cooperative suppliers competing for a declining market. The organization refined its mission in 2013 emphasize "anti-defamation" of overseas refurbishing companies, and promoted used electronics exports through peer-reviewed fair trade agreements.  Importers of used equipment in Africa, Asia and Latin America consider the organization a defender of Tech Sector refurbishers.  WR3A remains dedicated to the principle that if used computer exports are outlawed, only outlaws will export used computers.
  The organization strongly refutes what it considers racial profiling of tech sector in emerging markets.

The organization has members in South America, Africa, Asia, North America, and Europe, dedicated to defending legitimate used electronics exporters from what the organization considers false and defamatory declarations as "e-waste" and "toxics externalization".

Recent activities
In 2015, 2017, and 2018 WR3A led visits to the Agbogbloshie District in central Accra, bringing journalists from Al Jazeera, The Independent, Smithsonian, and others to meet with Dagbani speaking translators.  The visit led the journalists to discredit allegations that Agbogbloshie was "the largest e-waste dump in the world", a "former wetland on the outskirts of the city", and that it received hundreds of sea containers full of junk electronics.  WR3A found credible evidence that dumping at the site was being exaggerated by Accra Metropolitan Association representatives interested in relocating economic refugees to develop the property, three months before forced evictions.  Used electronics processed at the site were shown to be delivered by carters with wheelbarrows, and to consist of devices, such as VCRs, which had been imported decades previously.  WR3A provided reporters with World Bank statistics showing domestic Ghana generation more than accounted for the e-waste observed in Ghana, and recorded the organization's own interviews of Ghana Tech Sector representatives (uploaded to Youtube / WR3A).

In September 2013, the WR3A adapted the tradename "Fair Trade Recycling". The trademark was registered with the USPTO and registered as a supplemental certification on May 26, 2015. The organization does not claim to be recognized by "fairtrade" (one word).

In April 2013, WR3A held a "Fair Trade Recycling Summit" at Middlebury College in Vermont.  The Summit brought together researchers from Memorial University (Canada), Pontificia Universidad Catholica de Peru, University of Southern California (USA), Massachusetts Institute of Technology (MIT), representatives of the USA International Trade Office, Basel Convention Secretariat, Interpol, and several used electronics importers from Africa, Asia, and Latin America.   The group deliberated on beneficial development in emerging markets through electronics reuse and repair (labelled "Tinkerer's Blessing" after Yuzo Takahashi's 2000 technology history, A Network of Tinkerers.).  The role of electronics repair and reverse engineering in development was contrasted with the so-called "Resource Curse" of economic development through natural resource exploitation.  Middlebury students and presenters discussed whether a more balanced approach to recycling secondary materials may be warranted.  A follow up meeting between WR3A and Interpol was held in July 2013.  In November, 2013, Interpol announced a new research program to study the used electronics trade before continuing arrests of African importers (Project Eden).

The debate between Fair Trade Recycling advocates and the anti-export organization Basel Action Network was profiled in USA Today (September 26, 2013), in Discovery Magazine, and in NIH in 2006

In July 2012, Memorial University of Newfoundland, Canada, announced a 5-year research project to study and map the routes of used electronics, WEEE, and "e-waste" exports.   WR3A is a partner in the research grant, along with researchers from universities in Peru and California.  The first year, the group will document efforts to develop a "Fair Trade Recycling" model in Mexico (see NPR, PBS, AP, coverage), and then research the possible application of the model to Peru, Bangladesh, and China.

WR3A formerly adapted and registered the tradename "Fair Trade Recycling" in 2012.

WR3A collaborated with Massachusetts Institute of Technology for publication of MIT's January 2012 study on E-waste generation and exports.  WR3A provided researchers with detailed reconciliations of 3 years of exports from WR3A members.  MIT compared WR3A data to corroborating data from ISRI, USEPA, Basel Secretariat (Ghana, Nigeria) studies.

In May 2011, WR3A was interviewed as part of an "e-waste" by German news magazine ZDF.Kultur, which investigated the assumptions that African imports were "primitive" and linked exports to Egypt's Green Revolution.

In March, 2011. WR3A was profiled in Motherboard.tv, for the organization's case that reduced exports of used electronics by "stewards" was having unintended consequences.

In October, 2010, WR3A announced a partnership with Basel Action Network to reduce unnecessary breakage and destruction of working computer monitors in California, under California SB20 laws.  This followed a report critical of California "cancellation" policies published in the Sacramento Bee on July 19, 2010.

On July 30, 2010, Discovery News presented an analysis contrasting WR3A's "fair trade" engagement approach with the Basel Action Network's (BAN) "trade restriction" approach, and abstained from choosing sides.,

On May 15, 2009, National Public Radio's (NPR) program Living On Earth profiled one of WR3A's members - a women's cooperative doing TV repair and recycling in Mexico.

In January 2009, the organization presented statistics and a film at the Keynote Address of the CES 2009 in Las Vegas.  The statistics demonstrated that the rate of growth of internet access is much higher in countries with very low incomes.  It is logically unlikely that this growth can be achieved with new computers. The WR3A also presented film of the reuse and refurbishing operations which demonstrate proper recycling practices and best available practices in these ten countries.

The WR3A was contracted as a consultant to the US Environmental Protection Agency for its July 2008 publication Electronic Waste Management in the United States.

References

External links
World Reuse, Repair and Recycling Association

Organizations established in 2006
Recycling organizations
Electronic waste
Reuse